The U.S. Center for World Mission, also known as the Venture Center, was a collaborative Christian mission base located on a 15-acre campus in Pasadena, California. It was sold in 2019. The Venture Center sought to connect other like-minded organizations around prayer, research, innovation, media, education, strategy, and mobilization with a continued focus on unreached people groups. Archives of the center now reside at the Ralph D. Winter Research Center. Many Christian ministries had their genesis at the center or resided for a season before moving on to new locations throughout the world.

Founders
The center was founded by Ralph D. Winter (1924-2009) and his wife Roberta Winter (1930-2001), who served as Presbyterian missionaries for 10 years to the Mam people, a Mayan tribal group in Guatemala. 
After that, in 1967, Ralph Winter served as professor at the School of World Mission (or SWM, now called School of Intercultural Studies) at Fuller Theological Seminary until 1976, when he founded the U.S. Center for World Mission on the former Nazarene University campus in Pasadena.  This was also formerly the site for the Pacific Bible College and Pasadena College (1897-1976).

The Venture Center and its affiliated ministries are run by members of Frontier Ventures, which was founded by Ralph D. Winter.

History

In 1974, the Institute of International Studies arose out of a need not only to train people as missionaries but also to provide an intensive foundation on what is happening in the world and what needs to happen. It is now called the "Perspectives on the World Christian Movement", or "Perspectives" for short.  With over 100,000 alumni in North America alone, the course covers information crucial to any person interested in "God's global purposes" and has said to be a "life changing experience" for many who have taken it.

Building on these ministries, the Winters founded the U.S. Center for World Mission in 1976 in a few rented offices on the 17-acre campus of Pasadena Nazarene College. Their purpose was to pull people together to concentrate on the unreached people.
The U.S. Center went on to purchase the campus which was up for sale at that time. They were involved in a bidding war with the Church Universal and Triumphant. The money came primarily through small gifts of individual Christians around the country, and through the efforts of televangelist Dr. William Davis who promoted the project on national television and traveled across the country to meet personally with wealthy Christian donors. The final payment for the campus was made in 1988.

The efforts to establish the U.S. Center have also led to the development of a wide-ranging movement to the frontiers of mission that now involves thousands of people and hundreds of missions organizations. The Center seeks to serve this growing movement with resources, information, and strategic insights that can help the movement grow and effectively reach all the unreached peoples. In 2015, the US Center was renamed the Venture Center.

Venture Center Ministries
 Mission Frontiers magazine 
 Global Prayer Digest
 Joshua Project
 Roberta Winter Institute 
 INSIGHT (an acronym for: INtensive Study of Integrated Global History and Theology. One or two year college-level course.)
 International Journal of Frontier Missiology 
William Carey International University
Perspectives Global 
Prime 
William Carey Library Publishers 
Perspectives (Perspectives on the World Christian movement) a 15-week course.

See also
Providence Christian College in Pasadena, California

Notes

Further reading

  (A published PhD from the University of Wales Trinity Saint David)

External links
Frontier Ventures Missionary Order which is located on the Venture Center
William Carey Library Mission Resource Publishing website
Perspectives Perspectives on the World Christian Movement website
Fuller Theological Seminary Official website of Fuller Theological Seminary
Lausanne Movement for World Evangelization Official website of the Lausanne Movement for World Evangelization
Mission Frontiers Mission Frontiers website

1976 establishments in California
2019 disestablishments in California
Christian missions in North America
Pasadena, California